The Portsmouth Queen was a vessel owned by the Gosport Ferry Company Ltd. It was built by Thornycroft of Woolston, Hampshire.

History
The vessel was built in 1966 to the exact design to the Gosport Queen and was delivered in a green and white livery. Later, it was repainted into the now standard Gosport Ferry colours. The vessel is no longer in service, but use to run alongside the new Spirit of Gosport or the Spirit of Portsmouth. In the early days it was always hard to tell Portsmouth Queen apart from her twin sister Gosport Queen.

The Portsmouth Queen was sold to Absolute Charters and left Gosport for the final time on 29 February 2016, to start a new life on the River Thames in London, and was renamed 'London Queen'. However, to date, work has stalled on the refit of the former Portsmouth Queen and the vessel remained in Queenborough and was once again up for sale. In April 2022, she was in the drying harbour in St Peter Port, Guernsey. However in June 2022 under tow she returned to the UK.

Ferries of England
Gosport Ferry
1966 ships
Ships built by John I. Thornycroft & Company